The 2009 Skate America was the fifth event of six in the 2009–10 ISU Grand Prix of Figure Skating, a senior-level international invitational competition series. It was held at the Herb Brooks Arena in Lake Placid, New York on 12–15 November. Medals were awarded in the disciplines of men's singles, ladies' singles, pair skating, and ice dancing. Skaters earned points toward qualifying for the 2009–10 Grand Prix Final. The compulsory dance was the Golden Waltz.

The title sponsor was Cancer.Net.

Schedule
All times are Eastern Standard Time (UTC-5).

 Friday, 13 November
 15:00 – Ice dancing: Compulsory dance
 19:30 – Pairs: Short program
 21:00 – Men: Short program
 Saturday, 14 November
 14:00 – Ice dancing: Original dance
 15:55 – Pairs: Free skating
 19:00 – Ladies: Short program
 20:57 – Men: Free skating
 Sunday, 15 November
 14:00 – Ladies: Free skating
 16:27 – Ice dancing: Free dance

Results

Men

Ladies

 In the short program, Kim Yuna set an ISU World Record of 76.28 points.

Pairs
 In the short program, Shen Xue / Zhao Hongbo tied the ISU World Record of 74.36 points.

 WD = Withdrawn

Ice dancing

References

External links

 
 
 
 Official site
 
 ISU Results Page

Skate America, 2009
Skate America
Skate America